Shalash Darreh (also Romanized as Shalāsh Darreh and Shālesh Darreh) is a village in Aliyan Rural District, Sardar-e Jangal District, Fuman County, Gilan Province, Iran. At the 2006 census, its population was 212, in 60 families.

References 

Populated places in Fuman County